The men's singles competition of the 2022 European Table Tennis Championships was held from 14 to 21 August 2022.

Playing system 
Draw of 64
32 seeded players
24 winners of the qualification groups
8 winners of the preliminary round 2 matches

Group Play Stage 
The winners of the groups will qualify to the Main Draw.
The runners-up from all the groups will play 2 preliminary rounds for the remaining 8 spots.

Group 1

Group 2

Group 3

Group 4

Group 5

Group 6

Group 7

Group 8

Group 9

Group 10

Group 11

Group 12

Group 13

Group 14

Group 15

Group 16

Group 17

Group 18

Group 19

Group 20

Group 21

Group 22

Group 23

Group 24

Preliminary round 
The winners of the preliminary round 2 matches will qualify for the Main draw.

Main Draw 
Results

Section 1

Section 2

Section 3

Section 4

Finals

Participating nations 
115 players from 38 nations.

References

External links 
European Table Tennis Union
Munich 2022

2022 European Table Tennis Championships